The 2017 Memphis Open was a tennis tournament, played on indoor hard courts.  It was the 42nd edition of the Memphis Open, and part of the ATP World Tour 250 series of the 2017 ATP World Tour. It took place at the Racquet Club of Memphis in Memphis, Tennessee, United States, from 13 through 19 February 2017. Unseeded Ryan Harrison won the singles title.

Points and prize money

Point distribution

Prize money

Singles main-draw entrants

Seeds

1 Rankings as of February 6, 2017

Other entrants 
The following players received wildcards into the main draw:
  Jared Donaldson
  Reilly Opelka
  Frances Tiafoe

The following players received entry from the qualifying draw:
  Matthew Ebden 
  Darian King 
  Peter Polansky 
  Tim Smyczek

The following player received entry as a lucky loser:
  Benjamin Becker

Withdrawals 
Before the tournament
  Dustin Brown →replaced by  Benjamin Becker
  Daniel Evans →replaced by  Nikoloz Basilashvili

Doubles main-draw entrants

Seeds 

1 Rankings are as of February 6, 2017.

Other entrants 
The following pairs received wildcards into the main draw:
  Cedric De Zutter /  Connor Glennon 
  David O'Hare /  Joe Salisbury

Withdrawals
Before the tournament
  Guillermo García López

Finals

Singles 

  Ryan Harrison defeated  Nikoloz Basilashvili, 6–1, 6–4

Doubles 

  Brian Baker /  Nikola Mektić defeated  Ryan Harrison /  Steve Johnson, 6–3, 6–4

References

External links 
 

Memphis Open
Memphis Open
Memphis Open
Memphis Open (tennis)